White Hurricane can refer to these weather events:

 Great Blizzard of 1888 - A powerful blizzard that affected the Northeast United States
 Great Lakes Storm of 1913 - A blizzard that affected the Great Lakes region of the U.S. and Canada
 Great Blizzard of 1978 - A blizzard that affected the Great Lakes region of the U.S. and Canada
 Storm of the Century (1993) - A large storm system that affected the eastern third of the North America